The quadrant count ratio (QCR) is a measure of the association between two quantitative variables. The QCR is not commonly used in the practice of statistics; rather, it is a useful tool in statistics education because it can be used as an intermediate step in the development of Pearson's correlation coefficient.

Definition and properties 
The formula for calculating the QCR is then:

 

The QCR is always between −1 and 1. Values near −1, 0, and 1 indicate strong negative association, no association, and strong positive association (as in Pearson's correlation coefficient). However, unlike Pearson's correlation coefficient the QCR may be −1 or 1 without the data exhibiting a perfect linear relationship.

Example 

The scatterplot shows the maximum wind speed (X) and minimum pressure (Y) for 35 Category 5 Hurricanes. The mean wind speed is 170 mph (indicated by the blue line), and the mean pressure is 921.31 hPa (indicated by the green line). There are 6 observations in Quadrant I, 13 observations in Quadrant II, 5 observations in Quadrant III, and 11 observations in Quadrant IV. The value of Pearson's correlation coefficient for these data is −0.63, also indicating a moderate negative relationship..

See also 
 Guidelines for Assessment and Instruction in Statistics Education
 Mean absolute deviation (MAD) – A statistic used as a precursor to standard deviation.

References 

Statistical ratios
Covariance and correlation